Leucopogon interstans is a species of flowering plant in the heath family Ericaceae and is endemic to the south-west of Western Australia. It is an erect shrub with brownish hairs on its young branchlets, erect, narrowly elliptic or narrowly egg-shaped leaves and white or pinkish flowers in groups in upper leaf axils or on the ends of branches.

Description
The leaves are more or less flat and glabrous, the lower surface a paler shade of green.

Taxonomy and naming
Leucopogon interstans was first formally described in 2008 by Michael Clyde Hislop in the journal Nuytsia from specimens collected near Rocky Gully in 1982. The specific epithet (interstans) means "standing in between", referring to this species being "somewhat intermediate" between L. australis and L. capitellatus.

Distribution and habitat
This leucopogon grows in woodland and forest, sometimes in heath at higher altitudes, and is widespread in the area between the Scott River near Augusta, Albany, Bridgetown and the Stirling Range in the Avon Wheatbelt, Esperance Plains, Jarrah Forest and Warren bioregions of south-western Western Australia.

Conservation status
Leucopogon interstans is listed as "not threatened" by the Government of Western Australia Department of Biodiversity, Conservation and Attractions.

References

interstans
Ericales of Australia
Flora of Western Australia
Plants described in 2008